Ian John Turner (born 18 July 1968 in Denmead, Hampshire) is a retired English cricketer. Turner was a right-handed batsman and a slow left-arm orthodox bowler.

Turner made his Hampshire first-class debut against Glamorgan in 1989 at the County Ground. The four day format of the game was where Turner was most at home. It was not until the 1992 season that Turner made his one-day debut for the club against Gloucestershire.

After the 1993 County Championship season Turner was released by Hampshire, having struggled to make regular appearances in the first team. Turner played 24 first-class and 17 one-day matches for the club, taking 54 wickets at an average of 36.38.

External links
Ian Turner on Cricinfo
Ian Turner on CricketArchive
Matches and detailed statistics for Ian Turner

1968 births
Living people
People from the City of Winchester
English cricketers
Hampshire cricketers
Hampshire Cricket Board cricketers